Goldwater v. Carter, 444 U.S. 996 (1979), was a United States Supreme Court case in which the Court dismissed a lawsuit filed by Senator Barry Goldwater and other members of the United States Congress challenging the right of President Jimmy Carter to unilaterally nullify the Sino-American Mutual Defense Treaty, which the United States had signed with the Republic of China, so that relations could instead be established with the People's Republic of China. Goldwater and his co-filers claimed that the President required Senate approval to take such an action, under Article II, Section II of the U.S. Constitution, and that, by not doing so, President Carter had acted beyond the powers of his office.  While dismissing the case the Court left open the question of the constitutionality of President Carter's actions.

Granting a petition for certiorari but without hearing oral arguments, the court vacated a court of appeals ruling on December 13, 1979, and remanded the case to a federal district court with directions to dismiss the complaint. A majority of six Justices ruled that the case should be dismissed without hearing an oral argument. Justices Lewis Powell and William Rehnquist issued two separate concurring opinions on the case. Rehnquist claimed that the issue concerned how foreign affairs were conducted between Congress and the President, and was essentially political, not judicial; therefore, it was not eligible to be heard by the court. Powell, while agreeing that the case did not merit judicial review, believed that the issue itself, the powers of the President to break treaties without congressional approval, would have been arguable had Congress issued a formal opposition through a resolution to the termination of the treaty. (The Senate had drafted such a resolution, but not voted upon it.) This would have turned the case into a constitutional debate between the executive powers granted to the President and the legislative powers granted to Congress. As the case stood, however, it was simply a dispute among unsettled, competing political forces within the legislative and executive branches of government, and hence still political in nature due to the lack of majority or supermajority vote in the Senate speaking officially as a constitutional institution. Today, the case is considered a textbook example of the political question doctrine in U.S. constitutional law.

U.S. Court of Appeals for the District of Columbia
In 1978, Senator Goldwater filed with the United States Court of Appeals for the District of Columbia Circuit.
 
The plaintiffs included Senators Barry Goldwater, Strom Thurmond, Carl Curtis, Jake Garn, Orrin Hatch, Jesse A. Helms; Senator-Elect Gordon Humphrey; and Congressmen Robert Bauman, Steve Symms, Larry McDonald, Robert Daniel Jr., Bob Stump, Eldon Rudd, John Ashbrook, and George Hansen.

The defendants of the appeals court include President Jimmy Carter and Secretary of State Cyrus Vance.

Cause of the Plaintiff's Appeal
The cause of the court of appeals by the plaintiffs was what the plaintiffs saw, and alleged, as the president's "unconstitutional" termination of the 1954 Defense Treaty with Republic of China, violation of Article II and Article VI of the U.S. Constitution and Public Law 95-384.

Order on Goldwater v. Carter by Judge Gasch
Judge Oliver Gasch upon consideration of the plaintiff's motion to alter or amend the Court's judgment on the case on June 6, 1979, gave the following orders:

 That the plaintiff's motion to alter or mend the judgement of June 6, 1979 be granted
 That the defendants' motion to dismiss is denied
 That the plaintiff's cross-motion for summary judgment be granted
 The judgment of the Court that defendant President Carter's notice of termination of the 1954 Mutual Defense Treaty Between the United States and the Republic of China must receive the approval of two-thirds of the United States Senate or a majority of both houses of Congress
 That defendant Secretary of State Cyrus R. Vance and his subordinate officers be enjoined from taking any action to implement the President's notice of termination.

Notice of the appeal was entered on October 17, 1979, and written by Alice Daniel, Acting Assistant Attorney General and signed by Attorney David J. Anderson.

Quotes

Conclusion
While dismissing the case of Goldwater v. Carter, the Supreme Court left open the question of the constitutionality of President Carter's actions. In their concurrences Powell and Rehnquist merely questioned the judicial merit of the case itself; they did not explicitly approve Carter's action. Moreover, Powell even stated that this could be a valid constitutional issue. Article II, Section II of the Constitution merely states that the President cannot make treaties without a Senate majority two-thirds vote. As it stands now, there is no official ruling on whether the President has the power to break a treaty without the approval of Congress.

See also
 List of United States Supreme Court cases, volume 444

References

External links
 
 Arizona State University Archives Online: Personal and Political Papers of Senator Barry M. Goldwater 1880s-2008

United States Supreme Court cases
United States political question doctrine case law
1979 in United States case law
Barry Goldwater
China–United States relations
Taiwan–United States relations
Presidency of Jimmy Carter
Carter administration controversies
United States Constitution Article Two case law
United States Constitution Article Three case law
United States Supreme Court cases of the Burger Court